This is a list of events from British radio in 1942.

Events

January
 29 January – The BBC Forces Programme transmits the first edition of Desert Island Discs, presented by Roy Plomley. Vic Oliver is the first castaway. The series will still be running (on BBC Radio 4) more than 75 years later.

February
 27 February – James Stanley Hey, a British Army research officer, helps develop radio astronomy, when he discovers that the sun emits radio waves.

March
 No events.

April
 No events.

May
 6 May – The Radio Doctor (Charles Hill) makes his first BBC radio broadcast giving avuncular health care advice to British civilians.
 19 May – A subsequently famous BBC outside broadcast recording captures the song of the common nightingale with the sound of Royal Air Force Lancaster bombers flying overhead.

June
 27 June –  The BBC resumes sponsorship of the Promenade Concerts.

July
 No events.

August
 No events.

September
 September – The Brains Trust first broadcast under this title on BBC Home Service radio in the United Kingdom.

October
 No events.

November
 8 November – Aspidistra medium wave radio transmitter goes into service in the south of England for black propaganda and military deception purposes against Nazi Germany.

December
 No events.

Debuts
 29 January – Desert Island Discs (1942–Present)

Continuing radio programmes

1930s
 In Town Tonight (1933–1960)

1940s
 Music While You Work (1940–1967)
 Sunday Half Hour (1940–2018)

Births
 20 February – Charlie Gillett, music presenter (died 2010)
 18 July – Dave Cash, DJ (died 2016)
 12 August – David Munrow, early music performer and presenter (Pied Piper on BBC Radio 3) (suicide 1976)
 24 October – Frank Delaney, Irish-born novelist and radio presenter (died 2017)
 24 December – Anthony Clare, Irish-born psychiatrist and radio presenter (died 2007)
 26 December – Emperor Rosko (Mike Pasternak), American-born DJ

See also 
 1942 in British music
 1942 in British television
 1942 in the United Kingdom
 List of British films of 1942

References 

 
Years in British radio
Radio